Cheung Wing-fat, also known as Mars, is a Hong Kong actor, action director, stuntman and martial artist. He is one of Jackie Chan's best friends.

Early life
Cheung Wing-fat was born in Hong Kong in 1954. He got the nickname "Weird Fire Star" after being involved in a car accident leaving him with two scars on his head. While working as a stuntman on a film in Thailand he got promoted to a supporting actor and needed a stage name. He picked "Mars" based on his nickname. He became a student of Madame Fan Fok Wah (粉菊花, aka Fen Juhua) in The Spring and Autumn Drama School. He practiced every day from 5am to 9pm.

Film career
Mars started acting in 1966 at the age of 12. He started out as an extra and later in supporting roles. Lackey and the Lady Tiger (1980) is only the film in which he played the leading role.

In 1971, Mars got his nickname "Mars" from a stunt co-ordinator who suggested it to him since his nickname on stage was Martian Monster, and he ended up with the name Mars after filming The Rescue.

In 1979, he joined the Jackie Chan Stunt Team and focused more on being a stuntman and action director rather than an actor. Being a very close friend of Chan, Mars has worked with Chan in numerous films starting with The Young Master (1980). He played a major supporting role in Chan's hit films, Project A, Project A II, Police Story and Police Story 2. Mars also had minor villain roles in Chan's other hit films, Crime Story, Drunken Master II and Thunderbolt. He also acted in many of Chan's other films and was also a stuntman in his films.

Ever since working in Jackie Chan's 1996 film Mr. Nice Guy, he has been using his real name instead. He had become a senior member in both Jackie Chan's and Sammo Hung's stunt team.

Filmography
Young and Furious (Part 1) (1966) - young child (uncredited)
The Golden Cup, the Wandering Dragon and the Decree to Kill (1966) - young child
The Monkey Goes West (1966) - Little Underwater Turtle Demon Child
The Golden Cup and the Wandering Dragon (1966) - young child (extra)
Come Drink With Me (1966) - one of the little kids (uncredited)
The One Armed-Swordsman (1967) - street kid that gets mask stolen
Blue Skies (1967) - musical troupe dancing child (extra)
Golden Swallow (1968) - Chang Shun's son
The Rescue (1971) - Tartar soldier (extra)
The Eunuch (1971) - soldier (extra) / (uncredited)
Trilogy of Swordsmanship (1972) - Shi's soldier fellow (cameo)
The Black Tavern (1972) - Officer Hai's servant
The Casino (1972) - casino thug (extra) (uncredited) / stunts (uncredited)
The Hurricane (1972) - Neng's thug / stunts
The Brutal Boxer (1972) - Chin / stunts
Tough Guy (1972) - extra (uncredited)
Fist of Fury (1972) - Japanese Person (uncredited) / stunts
Fist of Unicorn (1972) - Stuttering boy
Back Alley Princess (1973) - extra (uncredited)
Honor and Love (1973) - cameo
Dynamite Brothers (1973) - Tuen's henchman in the final fight (uncredited) / stunts (uncredited)
Fist to Fist (1973) - extra (uncredited)
Enter the Dragon (1973) - Han traitor (uncredited) / stunts (uncredited)
The Rendezvous of Warriors (1973) - extra (uncredited)
The Awaken Punch (1973) - (uncredited)
Little Tiger of Canton (1973) - cameo / stunts (as Fo Sing)
The Bastard (1973) - Gu's thug (extra) / stunts
The Rats (1973) - cameo
Village on Fire (1973)
The Young Tiger (1973) - Angry Thug in army pants (as Huo Hsing)
Ambush (1973) - Lao Er of Ximen Tigers
Village of Tigers (1974) - Ba clan member
Virgins of the Seven Seas (1974) - Pirate killed on ship
The Thunder Kick (1974) - (as Fo Sing)
The Shaolin Boxer (1974) - Chuan's student
Supermen Against the Orient (1974) - Thug (uncredited) / stunts
Super Kung Fu Kid (1974) - cameo / stunts 
Village of Tigers (1974) - Hero Bao's Friend
Bloody Ring (1974) - cameo
The Mandarin Magician (1974) - (as Fo Sing)
The Skyhawk (1974) - woodland attacker / stunts (as Fo Sing)
The Bod Squad (1974) - (as Huo Shing) 
Hong Kong Superman (1975) - extra(uncredited) / cameo / stunts
The Young Dragons (1975) - Lui Fu's thug / stunts
The Valiant Ones (1975) - Japanese swordsman pirate
The Golden Lion (1975) - Golden Lion gang member
Bruce Lee and I (1976) - Little Boy
Bruce Lee - True Story (1976) - Charlie
The Private Eyes (1976) - robber (as Fo Sing)
The Magic Blade (1976) - stunts
Shaolin Plot (1977) - Monk (as Fo Sing)
Last Strike (1977) - extra (uncredited)
The Iron Fisted Monk (1977) - Shu-Liu worker
Broken Oath (1977) - One of Chou's Guards
Soul Brothers of Kung Fu (1977) - cameo
The Pilferer's Progress (1977) - Hitman
He Has Nothing But Kung Fu (1977) 
Strife for Mastery (1977) - cameo / stunts
The Amsterdam Kill (1977) - cameo
Enter the Fat Dragon (1978) - opening dream sequence fighter / stunts 
Strike and Sword (1978) - thug
Bruce Li - The Invincible Chinatown Connection (1978) - teacher with mask
Warriors Two (1978) - Thunder's men/Civilian (2 roles) / stunts
The Legendary Strike (1978)
Game of Death (1978) - Thug (extra) (uncredited) / stunts / stunt double
Iron Maiden - (as Fo Sing)
Dirty Tiger, Crazy Frog (1978) - 3 Tricks Kid partner / Casino Fighter
Naked Comes the Huntress (1978) - Monk
Fists and Guts (1979) - extra (uncredited)
Last Hurrah for Chivalry (1979) - Pak Chung Tong's man
His Name Is Nobody (1979) - person in restaurant (cameo)
The Challenger (1979) - Fair croupier (as Fo Sing)
Odd Couple (1979) - Potato
Crazy Couple (1979) - extra (uncredited) / stunts
The Wickedness in Poverty (1979) - Toilet waste carrier (cameo)
The Incredible Kung Fu Master (1979) - one of Yang Wei's men (cameo) / stunts 
Crazy Partner (1979) - cameo
The Dragon, the Hero (1979) - Defeated Fighter (cameo) / stunts
Knockabout (1979) - Tiger (as Fo Sing)
Itchy Fingers (1979) - Mr Liu's thug / stunts (uncredited)
Lackey and the Lady Tiger (1980) - Big Brother
The Young Master (1980) - extra (uncredited) / stunts (uncredited)
The Legal Illegal (1981) - cameo
Return of the Deadly Blade (1981) - One of the Tun brothers
Game of Death II (1981) - guard in the cave / stunts (uncredited)
Dragon Lord (1982) - Chin / Cowboy
The Trail (1983) - Fatty / action director / stunt co-ordinator
Project A (1983) - Mars / Jaws / stunts / stunt double for Jackie Chan / assistant action director
Winners and Sinners (1983) - Robber stealing Archie's briefcase (cameo)
Wheels on Meals (1984) - extra (uncredited) / action director / stunt co-ordinator / stunt double for Jackie Chan
Pom Pom (1984) - Motorcycle Cop (cameo)
The Protector - martial arts co-ordinator
Police Story (1985) - Inspector Kim / action director / stunt unit / stunts (uncredited)
Armour of God (1986) - extra (uncredited) / stunts(uncredited) / stunt double for Jackie Chan (uncredited)
Naughty Boys (1986) - Sheng
Project A Part II (1987) - Mars / Jaws / stunts / stunt double for Jackie Chan / action director 
Magic Story (1987) - Taoist priest
The Inspector Wears Skirts (1988) - Member of Tiger Squad
Spooky, Spooky (1988) - East Bay Cop Mars
Police Story 2 (1988) - Inspector Kim
Dragons Forever (1988) - stunts / stunt double for Benny Urquidez
Miracles (1989) - Police Sergeant / stunts
The Inspector Wears Skirts II (1989) - Mars
Undeclared War (1990) - Tiger (as Fo Sing) / stunts
Stage Door Johnny (1990) - Kuo
The Banquet (1991) - Man at Table (as Sing Feng)
Armour of God II: Operation Condor (1991) - extra (uncredited) / stunts (uncredited)
Angry Ranger (1991) - extra (uncredited) / stunts
Twin Dragons (1992) - Street Goon (uncredited) / stunts (uncredited)
Police Story 3: Super Cop (1992) - Hsiung (uncredited) / stunts (uncredited)
Crime Story (1993) - Bank Robber (uncredited) / stunts 
Once a Cop (1993) - Jewelry store customer (as Fo Sing) / stunts (uncredited)
Drunken Master II (1994) - Fight Spectator in the crowd/Thug in final fight (2 roles)(uncredited) / stunts (as Fo Sing) / assistant action director 
The Wrath of Silence (1994) - Detective / action director
Red Zone (1995) - Prison Guard with Food
Thunderbolt (1995) - Saw's thug (uncredited) / stunts (as Chiang Wing Fat)
Rumble in the Bronx (1995) - stunts (uncredited)
How to Meet the Lucky Stars (1996) - Mahjong Player / action director
Police Story 4: First Strike (1996) - stunts (uncredited) / stunt double for Jackie Chan (uncredited)
Once Upon a Time in China and America (1997) - extra (uncredited) / stunts (as Chiang Wing Fat)
Mr. Nice Guy (1997) - extra (uncredited) / stunts (as Chiang Wing Fat) / stunt double for Jackie Chan / action director
Double Team (1997) - stunts (uncredited)
Till Death Do Us Part (1998) - Bill's man / stunts
Rush Hour (1998) - Juntao's Man in Hong Kong (uncredited) / stunts (uncredited)
Knock Off (1998) - stunts (uncredited) / assistant action director (uncredited)
Gorgeous (1999) - Masked Metal Bat Thug (uncredited) / stunts (uncredited)
Jackie Chan: My Stunts (1999) - Himself (Jackie Chan Stunt Team) / stunts (uncredited)
Moonlight Express (1999) - Officer Tung's detective
No Problem (1999) - cameo / stunts
Prostitute Killers (2000) - One of Brother Shark's men / stunts
Rush Hour 2 (2001) - extra (uncredited) / stunts (uncredited)
Virtues of Harmony (TV series) (2002) - Chan Wan (cameo)
Born Wild (2001) - action director
Inner Senses (2002) - action director
No Problem 2 (2002) - stunts (as Jiang Wing-Fat) / assistant action director 
Give Them a Chance (2003) - action director
Shanghai Knights (2003) - Torch Thug (uncredited) / stunts (uncredited)
Around the World in 80 Days (2004) - Scorpion / stunts (uncredited)
New Police Story (2004) - extra (uncredited) / stunts (uncredited)
Kung Fu Mahjong 3 - The Final Duel (2007) - Uncle Pao / action director
Bullet & Brain (2007) - Inspector Wong / action director
I Corrupt All Cops (2009) - Det. Sgt Major at meeting / action director
72 Tenants of Prosperity (2010) - action director
The Other Truth (TV series) (2011) - Lo Yiu Fat (Episode 20–25)
When Heaven Burns (TV series) (2011) - Leslie (cameo) (Episode 10)
Brother's Keeper (TV series) (2013) - Brother Babi
Bet Hur (TV series) (2017) - Slaughter city bodyguard

See also
Jackie Chan Stunt Team
Jackie Chan

References

External links
Hong Kong Cinemagic: Mars
Mars

1954 births
Living people
Hong Kong male film actors
Hong Kong martial artists